Chasing (lit. "Catch Him to Survive") is a 2016 South Korean action comedy film about a top CEO (played by Kim Seung-woo) who has his cellphone stolen by a fearless gang of male high-school students led by the rebellious Han Won-tae (played by Hyuk of VIXX, in his film debut) and homicide detective (played by Kim Jung-tae) who loses his gun to the same gang of high-school students. Both the gun and the cellphone are very valuable to the CEO and detective and begins a fast-paced pursuit in order to retrieve their items back from the gang.

The film was directed by Oh In-chun (the director of Mourning Grave) and released in theaters on January 7, 2016.

Plot

One night, Seung-Joo, CEO loses his cellphone to four male high-school students and Jung-Taek, a detective loses his gun to the same high-school students. The cellphone and gun are very valuable to Seung-Joo and Jung-Taek. The two men must get their items back from the delinquent high school students.

Cast
 Kim Seung-woo as Kim Seung-joo
 Kim Jung-tae as Do Jung-taek 
 Han Sang-hyuk as Han Won-tae 
 Shin Kang-woo as Shin Jae-kwon
 Kim Min-gyu as Kim Tae-young
 Moon Yong-suk as Moon Sung-min
 Choi Ho-joong as Kang Sil-jang
 Seo Beom-sik as An Gi-sa
 Lee Hae-joon as Seok-jung
 Jo Chang-geun as Jung-don
 Oh Man-seok as Bus driver
 Lee Han-wi as Detective
 Kim Min-kyung
 Ahn Gil-kang as Chairman Wang
 Yeojin Jeon  as Subway mother
 Kim Ji-hoo as Subway child
 Kang Nam-gil as Police Commissioner

Awards and nominations

References

External links
 Chasing at Naver 
 

South Korean action comedy films
2010s Korean-language films
2016 action comedy films
2016 comedy films
2010s South Korean films